Lichtenfels is a Landkreis (district) in Bavaria, Germany. It is bounded by (from the north and clockwise) the districts of Coburg, Kronach, Kulmbach, Bayreuth and Bamberg.

History

In medieval times the Main river was a border between the two main states possessing lands in this territory: the Bishopric of Bamberg, and the County of Andechs. The castle of Lichtenfels was property of Andechs, which later fell under the Duchy of Merania. In 1248 the Dukes of Merania became extinct, and the entire region was annexed by the clerical state of Bamberg. In 1803 the clerical states of Germany were dissolved, and the Bishopric of Bamberg fell to Bavaria.

The district was established in 1972 by merging the former districts of Lichtenfels and Staffelstein.

Geography

The district is situated on both banks of the river Main in the hills of the Franconian Jura (Fränkische Alb).

Coat of arms
Yellow and blue were the colours of Andechs resp. Merania. The bishopric of Bamberg is symbolised by the heraldic lion of Bamberg. On the left side there are the orb and the crown of the Holy Roman Empire.

Towns and municipalities

References

External links

Official website (German)

 
Districts of Bavaria